Marente de Moor (born 1972) is a Dutch novelist and columnist. She published four novels and two collections of short stories. She won the AKO Literatuurprijs (2011) and the European Union Prize for Literature (2014) for her novel De Nederlandse maagd (2010). Her work is translated into sixteen languages.

Life and career 
Marente de Moor was born in 1972 in The Hague in the Netherlands. She is the daughter of writer and piano teacher Margriet de Moor (born 1941) and visual artist Heppe de Moor (1938–1992). She studied Slavic language and literature at the Universiteit van Amsterdam and graduated in 1999. She lived in Russia from 1991 to 2001.

De Moor was a columnist for De Groene Amsterdammer. A collection of her columns in De Groene was published as Petersburgse vertellingen (Petersburgian tales) in 1999. Since 2009, she is a columnist for Vrij Nederland (VN). A collection of her columns in VN was published as Kleine vogel, grote man (Small bird, big man) in 2013.

Her fiction debut was the novel De overtreder (The offender) in 2007. He second novel De Nederlandse maagd (The Dutch virgin) was published in 2010 and won the AKO Literatuurprijs in 2011 and the European Union Prize for Literature in 2014. Her third novel Roundhay, tuinscène (Roundhay, garden scene) was published in 2013 (in 2018 as 'Aus dem Licht' by Hanser Verlag.)  Her fourth novel 'Phon' was published in 2019 in Dutch and in 2021 in German by Hanser Verlag.

Awards 
 AKO Literatuurprijs (2011) for De Nederlandse maagd
 European Union Prize for Literature (2014) for De Nederlandse maagd
 J.M.A. Biesheuvelprijs (2016) for Gezellige verhalen 
 F.Bordewijkprijs (2019) for Foon
 Jan Wolkersprijs (2019) for Foon

Bibliography 
 (1999) Petersburgse vertellingen (Petersburgian tales), columns
 (2007) De overtreder (The offender), novel
 (2010) De Nederlandse maagd (The Dutch virgin), novel
 (2013) Roundhay, tuinscène (Roundhay, garden scene), novel
 (2013) Kleine vogel, grote man (Small bird, big man), columns
 (2015) Gezellige verhalen, short stories
 (2018) Foon, novel

References

External links 
 

1972 births
Dutch columnists
21st-century Dutch novelists
Dutch women novelists
Living people
Writers from The Hague
Dutch women columnists
21st-century Dutch women writers